Bo Josefsson (born 11 July 1940) is a former international speedway rider from Sweden.

Speedway career 
Josefsson won the silver medal at the 1967 Swedish Championship. He rode in the top tier of British Speedway from 1967 to 1968, riding for Glasgow Tigers.

References 

Living people
1940 births
Swedish speedway riders
Glasgow Tigers riders
People from Nässjö Municipality
Sportspeople from Jönköping County